The Roman Catholic Archdiocese of Mombasa is the Metropolitan See for the Ecclesiastical province of Mombasa in Kenya.

History
 May 8, 1955: Established as Diocese of Mombasa e Zanzibar from the Metropolitan Archdiocese of Nairobi
 December 12, 1964: Renamed as Diocese of Mombasa
 May 21, 1990: Promoted as Metropolitan Archdiocese of Mombasa

Special churches
The seat of the archbishop is Holy Ghost Cathedral in Mombasa.

Bishops 

 Bishop of Mombasa e Zanzibar (Roman rite) 
 Bishop Eugene Joseph Butler, C.S.Sp. (1957–1964);  see below
 Bishops of Mombasa (Roman rite) 
 Bishop Eugene Joseph Butler, C.S.Sp. (1964–1978); see above
 Bishop Nicodemus Kirima (1978–1988), appointed Bishop of Nyeri; future Archbishop
 Bishop John Njenga (1988–1990); see below
 Metropolitan Archbishops of Mombasa (Roman rite)
 Archbishop John Njenga (1990–2005); see above
 Archbishop Boniface Lele (2005–2014 Died)
 Archbishop Martin Kivuva Musonde (2015–present)

Suffragan dioceses
 Garissa
 Malindi

Sources
 GCatholic.org
  Catholic Hierarchy
Kenya Conference of Catholic Bishops 
Archdiocese of Mombasa 

Mombasa
 
A